Basic/Four is a variety of Business Basic which originally ran on computers of the same name introduced in 1971. The company that produced the system, Management Assistance, Inc., was later known as Basic/Four Corporation, MAI Basic Four, Inc., and MAI Basic Four Information Systems.

Basic/Four Corporation was created as a subsidiary of Management Assistance, Inc. in Irvine, California. Basic/Four sold small business minicomputers that were assembled from Microdata Corporation CPUs.

MAI Basic Four Business Basic was one of the first commercially available business BASIC interpreters. MAI Basic Four (the company) originally sold minicomputers, but later offered superminicomputers and microcomputers. The computers ran an operating system with the BASIC interpreter integrated. The BASIC interpreter was written in TREE-META.

In 1985, Wall Street financier Bennett S. LeBow purchased the company after it had experienced significant operating financial losses. 

In 1988, LeBow used the company as a platform for an unsuccessful attempted hostile takeover of much larger Prime Computer.

In the mid-1980s, the company released accounting software for third-party microcomputers. In 1988, it released its own 80286-based workstation. 
The Basic4 system was utilized by many small banks and credit unions.

In 1990, the company changed its name to MAI Systems Corporation and changed its business to be a system integrator instead of a combined hardware and software manufacturer, reselling third-party computers but installing their own customer-specific software system. 

MAI Systems Corporation became a wholly owned subsidiary of Softbrands Inc. in 2006.

See also 
 MAI Systems Corp. v. Peak Computer, Inc.

References

External links
History of MAI
M.A.I. S10 Basic Four microcomputer system description
Pictures and descriptions of a few different Basic Four computers\

1971 establishments in California
2006 disestablishments in California
American companies established in 1971
American companies disestablished in 2006
BASIC interpreters
Computer companies established in 1971
Computer companies disestablished in 2006
Defunct computer companies of the United States